A Report of Some Proceedings on the Commission for the Trial of the Rebels in the Year 1746, in the County of Surry; And of Other Crown Cases: to which are Added Discourses Upon a Few Branches of the Crown Law, usually called simply Crown Law or Crown Cases, is an influential treatise on the criminal law of England, written by Sir Michael Foster (1689–1763), judge of the King's Bench and later edited by his nephew, Michael Dodson, barrister at law. It was first published in 1762. The third edition, edited by Dodson, and with an appendix containing new cases, was published in 1792 and seems to have been republished in 1809.

The book is divided into two sections. The first part, The Report, usually called Crown Cases, is a series of law reports. The second part, The Discourses, usually called Crown Law is essentially a textbook. The Report covers the trials of the participants in the second Jacobite Rising of 1745.

See also
Nominate reports
Books of authority
Woolmington v DPP

External links
Third edition of this book from Google Books:
1792 print 
Another copy of the 1792 print 
1809 Reprint 

1762 books
1762 in British law
Legal treatises
Case law reporters of the United Kingdom
Jacobite rising of 1745
British books